Three Days Grace is a Canadian rock band that formed in 1997. They have released seven studio albums, four extended plays, twenty six singles, two video albums, and eighteen music videos. They signed with Jive Records and released three albums on the label between 2003 and 2009 before the label was folded into the RCA Records umbrella in 2011; the band has released music through that label since then.

All but one of their singles ("Riot" in 2007) have charted in the top 10 on the Billboard Mainstream Rock Songs chart. As of 2022, they have tied with Shinedown, generating 17 number-one singles on that chart, breaking the record previously held by Van Halen. The band has sold over 10 million albums and singles combined worldwide.

Albums

Studio albums

Video albums

Extended plays

Singles

Promotional singles

Other charted and certified songs

Music videos

Guest appearances

References

Notes

Discographies of Canadian artists
Rock music group discographies